The Ermenonville Forest is a state-owned forest in Oise, France.

On 3 March 1974, Turkish Airlines Flight 981 crashed in the forest and in the commune of Fontaine-Chaalis, killing all 346 people on board.

Today, a memorial to the victims of THY flight 981 stands in the forest.

Gallery

References

Geography of Oise
Forests of France
Tourist attractions in Oise
Hauts-de-France region articles needing translation from French Wikipedia